The women's 5 kilometre classical cross-country skiing competition at the 1998 Winter Olympics in Nagano, Japan, was held on 10 February at Snow Harp. Each skier started at half-minute intervals, skiing the entire 5 kilometre course. The defending Olympic champion was the Russian Lyubov Yegorova, who won in Lillehammer.

Results

References

Women's cross-country skiing at the 1998 Winter Olympics
Women's 5 kilometre cross-country skiing at the Winter Olympics
Oly
Women's events at the 1998 Winter Olympics